Chicken skin can refer to: 

The skin of a chicken
Keratosis pilaris, a condition commonly known as 'chicken skin'
Goose bumps
Chicken Skin, an anthology of ghost stories by Glen Grant